Inverness Caledonian Thistle F.C. played their first official match in European competition on 16 July 2015. This made the club the first (and as of 2022, only) club from the Highlands to represent the area in European football.

Inverness' best run in European competition was their debut against Astra Giurgiu of Romania where they narrowly lost 1–0 on aggregate, denying an all British tie in the following round against English Premier League side, West Ham United.

Inverness first qualified for Europe with a 3rd placed finish, and a Scottish Cup title in the 2014–15 season following a 1–0 away victory over Dundee in the League, with the Scottish Cup title moving them forward a round. However, they narrowly missed out on an earlier European debut in the 2012–13 season, after a crushing 1–0 defeat against rivals, Ross County on the final day of the season forced Inverness out of the top 3, and missing European qualification by 2 points.

Statistics 
Note: Inverness scores are listed first.

By competition

By country

References 
Inverness Caledonian Thistle F.C.
Scottish football clubs in international competitions